Cassioli is a surname. Notable people with the surname include:

Amos Cassioli (1832–1891), Italian painter
Giuseppe Cassioli (1865–1942), Italian painter and sculptor, son of Amos

See also
Cascioli

Italian-language surnames